Claudio Vita-Finzi,  (born 21 November 1936) is an Australian-British geologist and academic. He was Professor of Neotectonics at University College London from 1987 to 2001, and has been a scientific associate at the Natural History Museum, London since 2001. His research is interdisciplinary, and involves the application of tectonics and planetary science on landscape change: this has led to him working alongside archaeologists and climatologists among others.

Honours
Vita-Finzi is the recipient of two medals from the Royal Geographical Society: the Back Award in 1971, and the Busk Medal in 2012 "for fieldwork on Mediterranean landscape change". In 1994, he was awarded the G. K. Warren Prize by the United States National Academy of Sciences "for his distinguished contributions to fluvial morphology in relation to climate, tectonic activity, and human history (archaeological geology), on the basis of field investigations on several continents". He was elected to the American Philosophical Society in 1997. In 2012, he was elected a Fellow of the British Academy (FBA), the United Kingdom's national academy for the humanities and social sciences.

Selected works

References

1936 births
Living people
Australian geologists
British geologists
Tectonicists
Academics of University College London
Employees of the Natural History Museum, London
Fellows of the British Academy
Fellows of the Royal Geographical Society
Members of the American Philosophical Society